Mill House may refer to:

Buildings 
United Kingdom
Mill House, Adlington, Cheshire, England

United States
Mill House (Milford, Delaware)
Mill House (Wells, Maine)
Mill House (Lewistown, Montana), listed on the National Register of Historic Places (NRHP) in Fergus County, Montana
Gomez Mill House, Newburgh, New York
Mill House (Middleburg, Virginia)
Mill House (Dayton, Washington), listed on the NRHP in Columbia County, Washington

Other uses 
 Mill House (horse), a racehorse
 Mill House Stable